Indiera Baja is a barrio in the municipality of Maricao, Puerto Rico. Its population in 2010 was 548.

History
Indiera Baja is one of the three , the other two being Indiera Alta and Indiera Fría. Difficult to access, this geographic area served as a refuge for Taínos fleeing Spanish and other European colonizers, who began colonizing Puerto Rico in the 15th century.

Puerto Rico was ceded by Spain in the aftermath of the Spanish–American War under the terms of the Treaty of Paris of 1898 and became an unincorporated territory of the United States. In 1899, the United States Department of War conducted a census of Puerto Rico finding that the population of Indiera Baja barrio was 933.

See also

 List of communities in Puerto Rico

References

Barrios of Maricao, Puerto Rico